How's Tricks is the fifth studio album by Scottish musician Jack Bruce, released in 1977 through RSO Records. It is credited to "The Jack Bruce Band".

The album peaked at No. 153 on the Billboard album chart in May 1977.  It would be Bruce's last album released under Robert Stigwood's management (and, consequently, his last for RSO); although the Jack Bruce Band would remain under contract with Stigwood for another year, the band's 1978 album Jet Set Jewel was rejected by Stigwood and RSO as not commercially viable, with the band subsequently dropped from the label.  Bruce's leaving Stigwood/RSO ended a fifteen-year affiliation that began in 1963 when Bruce joined the Graham Bond Organisation.

Critical reception
MusicHound Rock: The Essential Album Guide deemed the album "an uninspired set of 10 lackluster tunes." The Rolling Stone Album Guide called it "a journeyman effort hardly worth dredging up."

Track listing
"Without a Word" (Jack Bruce, Pete Brown) - 5:26
"Johnny B'77" (Jack Bruce, Pete Brown) - 3:23
"Times" (Jack Bruce, Pete Brown, Hughie Burns) - 4:49
"Baby Jane" (Hughie Burns) - 2:37
"Lost Inside a Song" (Jack Bruce, Pete Brown, Hughie Burns) - 4:04
"How's Tricks" (Jack Bruce, Pete Brown) - 4:12
"Madhouse" (Jack Bruce, Pete Brown) - 3:45
"Waiting for the Call" (Jack Bruce, Pete Brown) - 5:48
"Outsiders" (Jack Bruce, Pete Brown) - 2:57
"Something to Live For" (Tony Hymas, Pete Brown) - 5:19

2003 CD bonus tracks
"Without a Word" (alternate version) (Jack Bruce, Pete Brown) - 5:50
"Something to Live For" (alternate version) (Tony Hymas, Pete Brown) - 3:52

Personnel
Jack Bruce - vocals, bass, harmonica
Hughie Burns - guitars, backing vocals, lead vocals on "Baby Jane"
Tony Hymas - keyboards, vibraphone, backing vocals
Simon Phillips - drums, glockenspiel, backing vocals

References

1977 albums
Jack Bruce albums
RSO Records albums